Woosuk University (WU; Hangul:우석대학교, Hanja: 又石大學校, RR:Woosuk Daehakgyo) is a private university located in Wanju gun, North Jeolla Province and Jincheon gun, North Chungcheong Province, Republic of Korea.

Notable alumni
Chae Young-in, actress
Key, singer (SHINee)
Catherine Seulki Kang, South Korean-born naturalized Central African taekwondo practitioner, 2012 Olympics

External links
Woosuk University

References

Wanju County
Private universities and colleges in South Korea
Universities and colleges in North Jeolla Province
Educational institutions established in 1979
1979 establishments in South Korea